The 2013 monsoon season (August 2013 – December 2013) saw large-scale flooding return to Indochina after a calmer 2012 monsoon season.  Poverty stricken Cambodia was hardest hit, with some 83 deaths.  Countries affected also include Vietnam, Thailand, Laos, and Myanmar.  Philippines has seen the annual typhoon related occurrences, which often pummel into Indochina.

Background
Flooding and/or related typhoon damage is an annual occurrence in all of Southeast Asia.  However, deforestation, land subsidence, poor drainage, have exacerbated existing problems, while development of infrastructure such as dams, drainage, and pumps have lessened it elsewhere.  Despite a long history of devastation and little spread of news outside the region, more global attention has been paid to Southeast Asian flooding as it has become a manufacturing hub in the global supply chain and major tourist destination.

Cambodia
83 people, half of them children were killed and Preah Khan temple of Angkor Wat complex sustained damage.  Death toll updated to 104 Oct.9

Thailand
Severe flooding occurred in Eastern Thailand, especially in the provinces of Sa Kaeo, Prachin Buri, Chon Buri.  Floods unrelated to the monsoon occurred in Phuket.  Despite government assurances after the 2011 disaster, flooding has shutdown two factories at an Amata estate. As of Oct 9th, 28 out of 77 Thai provinces had been affected and 39 people had been killed, but the health ministry put the death toll at 51, with more than 3 million people affected since July.

Myanmar
As of 22 September 2013, the floods had made some 300,000 people homeless.

Vietnam
Typhoon Wutip killed 40 in Vietnam and removed 200,000 roofs.

See also
 2011 Southeast Asian floods

References

2013 floods in Asia
Environment of Southeast Asia
Floods in Asia